Diana Returning from the Hunt, Diana's Return from the Hunt or Diana After the Hunt is a 1745 oil-on-canvas painting by François Boucher, now in the musée Cognacq-Jay in Paris. It shows Diana and three of her nymphs refreshing themselves by a stream, with the rabbits and birds they have just hunted piled to the left.

References

1745 paintings
Mythological paintings by François Boucher
Paintings depicting Diana (mythology)
Birds in art
Hunting in art
Paintings of the Musée Cognacq-Jay